Desperate Courage is a 1928 American silent Western film directed by Richard Thorpe. The film stars Wally Wales, Olive Hasbrouck, and Tom Bay. Produced by the Poverty Row studio Action Pictures, it was released by Pathé Exchange on January 15, 1928.

Cast list
 Wally Wales as Jim Dane
 Olive Hasbrouck as Ann Halliday
 Tom Bay as Colonel Halliday
 Lafe McKee as A Brannon Brother
 Fanchon Frankel as A Brannon Brother
 Bill Dyer as A Brannon Brother
 Slim Whitaker as Henchman (credited as Charles Whitaker)
 Al Taylor as Henchman
 S. S. Simon as Sheriff

References

External links

 
 

1928 films
American black-and-white films
1928 Western (genre) films
Pathé Exchange films
Films directed by Richard Thorpe
Silent American Western (genre) films
1920s English-language films
1920s American films